Mark A. Seifrid is a scholar of the New Testament letters of Paul, currently working at Concordia Seminary in St. Louis, Missouri.

He was previously the Ernest and Mildred Hogan professor of New Testament interpretation at Southern Baptist Theological Seminary in Louisville, Kentucky. He is a graduate of Trinity Evangelical Divinity School, Deerfield, Illinois, and received his Ph.D. from Princeton Theological Seminary in 1990.

Seifrid has published major works on justification in the New Testament and a commentary on 2 Corinthians, and is currently writing a commentary on Galatians.

In 2021, a Festschrift was published in his honor. Always Reforming: Reflections on Martin Luther and Biblical Studies included contributions from Oswald Bayer, Robert Kolb, Benjamin L. Merkle, and Thomas R. Schreiner.

Selected works

Books

Articles and chapters

References

Living people
Bible commentators
Trinity Evangelical Divinity School alumni
Princeton Theological Seminary alumni
Southern Baptist Theological Seminary faculty
American biblical scholars
New Testament scholars

Year of birth missing (living people)
Lutheran Church–Missouri Synod people